Israeli Pro Wrestling Association is an independent wrestling promotion, operating from Israel.

History
IPWA was founded on October 17, 2001 by Gery Roif and ran a few exhibition matches on national TV before holding the initial Summer Splash event in summer 2002. Roif was crowned its first champion after defeating Texas Wrestling Academy graduate Joey "The MOALM" Tylec in a televised match in the summer of 2003.

Subsequently, the IPWA gained a fair amount of recognition worldwide; toward the end of 2003 Total Wrestling magazine started publishing its rankings on a monthly basis.
Summer Splash 3 in 2004 featured FWA star Aviv Maayan making a one-night appearance to team up with Hawaii Allen and take on Jumping Lee and Yossi The Bull with Joey Tylec finally defeating Gery Roif to win the IPWA title.

In 2005 almost the entire IPWA roster starred in a wrestling/social satire sitcom series "Makkat Medina" ("The Land Under Attack"), gaining further recognition in Israel. Both Kevin Von Erich and Bret Hart visited the crew during taping.
In the beginning of 2006, the IPWA Wrestlenovella event was aired on The Wrestling Channel. In June 2009, the promotion had an event that got aired on the local Ego Total channel under the title of Israeli Wrestling.
In the summer of 2011 Rabbi Swissa defeated Israel's Survivor reality show winner, Nathan Bashevkin.

In 2011 the promotion ran a series of monthly events, from "Makat Shemesh" at June to "Makot Besukut" at November.

On August 16, 2012 Tatanka main evented the Wrestling Super Show as he defeated Rabbi Swissa to win the IPWA Heavyweight Championship. Two months later the match was shown on Israeli sport channel ONE.

On April 19, 2014 former two time WWE Cruiserweight champion and two time ECW Tag Team champion, Little Guido defeated Rabbi Swissa in IPWA's traditional Passover Bash which was the last show of the promotion.

In April 2019 however, IPWA returned with an additional Passover Bash event, which featured Jay Lethal against David Starr. Originally, Lethal was scheduled to defend the ROH World Championship against Starr, but Lethal lost the title to Matt Taven in a Three-way ladder match, which included Marty Scurll as well at G1 Supercard event on April 6, 2019. The card also featured Gery Roif defending the IPWA Heavyweight Championship against Matt Sydal.

IPWA special events
The IPWA events feature professional wrestling matches that involve different wrestlers from pre-existing scripted feuds and storylines. Wrestlers portrayed villains, heroes, or less distinguishable characters in the scripted events that built tension and culminated in a wrestling match or series of matches.

IPWA Passover Bash

On 21 April 2019, IPWA put on their return event, IPWA Passover Bash. It was held at Berale in Lehavot Haviva and drew 200 people.

IPWA Wrestling Party

On 26 August 2019, IPWA put on their second return event, IPWA Wrestling Party. It was held at Berale in Lehavot Haviva and drew approximately 80 people.

IPWA at Cinema City

On 15 December 2019, IPWA put on their third return event, IPWA Cinema City Wrestling. It was held at Cinema City in Ramat Hasharon and drew over 300 people.

Roster

Last known roster

 Rabbi Swissa
 Hellboy
 Guy Landau
 Joey Tylec
 Killer Degani
 Lior Libman
 Sharon Palty
 Ivan Brovkin
 Khan Hannibal
 Johnny Horvitz

 Adam Blood
 Tomer Offner
 Rixon Ruas
 Boom Bregman
 Jack Dahma
 Jason Cruz
 Sean Hayes 
 Maor Mizrahi
 Yokozuna Shavit
 Gaya Glass

Alumni
 Aviv Maayan
 Tatanka
 "Bad Ass" Billy Gunn
 Little Guido
 Tomer Shalom
 Jay Lethal
 David Starr
 Matt Sydal
 Darby Allin
 Sammy Guevara
 Nadia Sapphire
 Molly Spartan

IPWA Heavyweight Championship

The IPWA Heavyweight Championship is the only professional wrestling championship in the Israeli Pro Wrestling Association promotion. At the end of 2002, Israeli professional wrestler Gery Roif announced a match between himself and Joey "The Moalm" Tylec to determine the first IPWA Heavyweight Champion. The current champion is Matt Sydal, who is in his first reign.

From the IPWA Heavyweight Championship's inception in 2003, there have been thirteen different title holders, combining for eighteen championship reigns.

Reigns

Combined reigns

See also
 Professional wrestling in Israel
Sports in Israel

References

External links
Results at Online World of Wrestling
Official IPWA English website
Official IPWA website

Israeli professional wrestling promotions
2003 establishments in Israel
Organizations established in 2003
Organizations based in Netanya
Professional wrestling schools